Lorraine Rodero Inouye (born June 22, 1940) is an American politician from the state of Hawaii. A member of the Democratic Party, she serves in the Hawaii State Senate, representing District 4. She is of no relation to prominent U.S. senator from Hawaii Daniel Inouye.

Political career
Inouye was elected to the Hawaii County Council in 1984. In 1990, Inouye ran in a special election to serve the remainder of the term of Bernard Akana, who died in office, as Mayor of Hawaii County. She defeated Stephen K. Yamashiro by 76 votes, becoming the first Filipino-American woman to serve as the mayor of a U.S. County. She ran for re-election in 1992 but lost to Yamashiro.

Inouye ran for the District 1 seat in the Hawaii Senate in 1998, challenging incumbent Democrat Malama Solomon. Inouye defeated Solomon in the primary, and won the general election. She served through 2008. That year, she received a primary challenge from Dwight Takamine, and chose instead to run for Mayor of Hawaii County. Though she initially led her opponents in the opinion polls, she finished third in the Democratic primary, behind eventual winner Billy Kenoi and Angel Pilago.

In 2012, Inouye ran for District 4 in the State Senate. She was defeated in the Democratic primary election by Solomon, the incumbent from District 1. In March 2014, Inouye announced she would challenge Solomon in the upcoming primary election to represent District 4. She defeated Solomon in the primary, and won the general election.

Personal life
Inouye graduated from Hilo High School. Prior to running for political office, Inouye worked as a hotelier. Inouye is married to Vernon Inouye, who grows and exports flowers and serves as co-owner, president, and general manager of Floral Resources Hawaii. She serves as president of Aloha Blooms, the family-owned anthurium farm.

References

External links

1940 births
Living people
21st-century American politicians
21st-century American women politicians
American hoteliers
American women of Filipino descent in politics
Hawaii County Council members
Democratic Party Hawaii state senators
Hawaii politicians of Filipino descent
Mayors of Hawaii County
People from Hilo, Hawaii
Women state legislators in Hawaii
Asian-American people in Hawaii politics
Women mayors of places in Hawaii